Maranatha Christian University (Universitas Kristen Maranatha) is a private university in Bandung, the largest metropolitan city and the capital city of West Java, Indonesia.

Maranatha Christian University has produced more than 30,000 alumni that contribute in development sectors in Indonesia and abroad. This contribution is continuously supported by cooperation programs with other educational, governmental, and social institutions, as well as industrial organizations and cooperating partners from inside and outside the country.

History 

The long history of Maranatha Christian University began on September 11, 1965 with the establishment of Yayasan Perguruan Tinggi Kristen Maranatha by Badan Pendidikan Kristen Komisi Pembantu Setempat (the Local Branch of Christian Education Commissioning Board) of Gereja Kristen Indonesia (Indonesian Christian Church) and Badan Perguruan Tinggi dan Pendidikan Kristen (the Board for Tertiary and Christian Education) of Gereja Kristen Pasundan (Pasundan Christian Church) on the instigation of the Bandung branch of Perkumpulan Inteligensia Kristen Indonesia (the Association of Indonesian Christian Intelligence). Maranatha Christian University then officially began its operation with the establishment of Faculty of Medicine.

The first campus building on Jalan Cihampelas was built in 1970, followed by a second one on Jalan Suria Sumantri in 1983. Since then, Maranatha Christian University has continued developing its facilities and infrastructure in the second campus, the area of which reaches 130,000 square meters. The university has plans to expand its campus to other strategic locations.

Faculties 
Maranatha Christian University currently consists of 9 faculties with 4 diploma programs, 18 undergraduate programs, 3 professional programs, and 4 graduate programs. It comprises more than 10,000 Indonesian students, as well as students from other countries.

Profession programs 
 Doctor Profession Education Program
 Dentist Profession Education Program

Student activities 
Campus life in Maranatha Christian University is filled with academic and nonacademic activities that aim at developing students’ characters as a whole. The extracurricular, nonacademic activities are facilitated in internal organizations, especially in student associations and activity units. There have been many nonacademic achievements attained through these units, complementing the students’ academic achievements.

References

External links 
 
 International website 
 Website SAT (Perwalian Online)

Universities in Bandung
Universities and colleges affiliated with the Indonesian Christian Church
Educational institutions established in 1965
Private universities and colleges in Indonesia
Association of Christian Universities and Colleges in Asia
1965 establishments in Indonesia